Kenan Korkmaz (born April 21, 1969 in Diyarbakır, Turkey) is a Turkish filmmaker, educated at Çukurova University where he has also lectured in cinematography and photography. His first feature film, Lüks Otel (The Luxury Hotel) won the 2011 award Golden Orange for Best Cinematographer and the jury´s special awards for Best Film and Best Music at the 48th International Antalya Golden Orange Film Festival. Korkmaz was the director of photography for the 2013 feature film Yola Çikmak (Take the Road) directed by Evren Erdem. For the 2014 feature film Gittiler 'Sair ve Mechul' (Gone 'The Other and the Unknown´), Korkmaz was responsible for script, directing, photography and editing.

Filmography 
Gittiler 'Sair ve Mechul''' (2014) Feature film, 1 hr 37 minYola Çikmak (2013) Feature film, 1 hr 30 min (as director of photography)Lüks Otel (2011) Feature film, 1 hr 32 min

 References 

 External links 
 
 
 Gittiler 'Sair ve Mechul' reviewed by The Hollywood Reporter Gittiler 'Sair ve Mechul' in Hurriyet''

Living people
1969 births
Turkish filmmakers
Çukurova University alumni